Ampang Tinggi is a small town and mukim in Kuala Pilah District, Malaysia. It is about 4 kilometers from the heart of the Kuala Pilah town centre. It is home to the Istana Ampang Tinggi built in 1865.

Transportation
The town is served by  Jalan Ampang Tinggi, which links the town to Tanjung Ipoh Federal Route 51 and Kuala Pilah town centre .

References

Kuala Pilah District
Towns in Negeri Sembilan